Cherry Valentine: Gypsy Queen and Proud is a 2022 English documentary film directed by Pete Grant and released on BBC Three and then WOW Presents Plus. The documentary tells the story of George Ward leaving the Gypsy community (from Darlington), after coming out as gay and being rejected by the community. Ward left his home and started his new life as Cherry Valentine, a drag alter-ego. In the documentary, Ward returned to his roots to see how he could do drag and be a Gypsy.

References 

2020s British films
2022 documentary films
2022 LGBT-related films
British documentary films
British LGBT-related films
Documentary films about gay men
Drag (clothing)-related films
Romani in the United Kingdom